Dennis Fong, better known by his online alias Thresh, is an American businessman and retired professional player of the first-person shooter video games Quake and Doom. He is a co-founder of Xfire, an instant messenger and social networking site for gamers, which was acquired by Viacom for 102 million in April 2006. He also co-founded Lithium Technologies, a social customer relationship management (CRM) company. In his playing career his highest profile victory came in 1997 at the Red Annihilation Quake tournament, where he placed first and won id Software CEO John D. Carmack's Ferrari 328. Fong is recognized by the Guinness World Records as the first professional gamer.

Playing career 
Fong began playing Doom at the age of 16 in 1993. He first chose the pseudonym Threshold of Pain, which referred to the ability to withstand enemy fire and suffering. However, as many games had an eight-character ID limit, he went with "Thresh" and liked the word's meaning of "to strike repeatedly".

Fong attended the Microsoft-sponsored Doom tournament Judgment Day 1995 in Seattle and defeated Ted "Merlock" Peterson to finish first among 24 competitors from across the US and United Kingdom.

The highlight of his gaming career was at the Red Annihilation tournament in 1997. He and Tom "Entropy" Kimzey emerged from a crowded field to face off in the Quake level E1M2 "Castle of the Damned", where Thresh defeated Entropy 14 to -1.

At the peak of his gaming career in the middle to late 1990s, he earned approximately $100,000 a year from prize money and endorsements. He retired in 1997 to focus on his business ventures.

On July 27, 2016, Thresh was the second person to be inducted into the ESL Hall of Fame. Fong has also been featured in Rolling Stone for his gaming prowess.

Business ventures 
Fong and his brother Lyle started GX Media, the parent company of Gamers.com, FiringSquad, and Lithium Technologies. Fong was the CEO of the company and Lyle was the chief technical officer. The company grew to 100 employees.

In 1999, GX Media raised over US$11 million from CMGI and built gamers.com, a popular web portal. Fong's Ferrari was parked in the lobby of the GX Media offices. In 2001, gamers.com was acquired by Ziff-Davis.

While running GX Media, Fong was also editor-in-chief at the video gaming site FiringSquad, wrote a monthly column in the popular PC Gamer magazine and co-authored the official Quake II strategy guide with Jonathan Mendoza and Kenn Spear Hwang.

GX Media spun off Lithium Technologies, a leading Social CRM platform provider that counts AT&T, PlayStation, Verizon, Comcast and Best Buy as some of its customers. The company has raised over $40 million from Benchmark Capital, Emergence Capital, Shasta Ventures, DAG Ventures and Tenaya Capital.

Fong went on to co-found Xfire, an Instant messaging client designed for online gaming, that was acquired by Viacom in April 2006 for  102 million. In 2007, Fong founded Raptr, a social network and related software client for gamers. The company has raised over $12 million in financing from Accel Partners.

Fong serves as an adviser for WeGame.com Inc and also served in the same capacity to the now-defunct Booyah, Inc.

Playing style 
In games, Fong is known for his reflexes, intuition and tactics. People coined the term "Thresh ESP" to describe his unnatural knack for knowing exactly what his opponents were doing. In 1 on 1 deathmatch, he made it a priority to understand the level and "control" vital items using timed runs to repeatedly hoard them from opponents, such as the rocket launcher and armor in Quake.

Fong has been credited with popularizing the WASD key configuration now commonly used in PC gaming.

Personal life 
Fong was born in Hong Kong on March 11, 1977. He also lived in Beijing for a while. His parents, David and Lena Fong, were educated in America and are US citizens. He and his family immigrated to the United States when he was 11 years old, and he grew up in Los Altos, California. His interests include playing roller hockey. Fong has two younger brothers, Lyle and Bryant. Lyle helped him co-found GX Media. Thresh attended De Anza College in Cupertino, California for a year in 1996–1997 before dropping out to focus on gaming. He currently resides in the San Francisco Bay Area.

See also 
 DWANGO

References 

 Additional sources 
    (about DeathRow)
 "Thresh: the legend of Quake". Cyberfight.org
 "King of the Gamers" Washington Post.
 "Valley Boys". Business Week cover story.

External links 
 Raptr
 FiringSquad
 Xfire
 Thresh's Quake Bible
 Thresh vs Entropy at the final of Red Annihilation 1997 (Quake Demo file)
 Youtube of the above demo with commentary

Living people
American chief executives in the media industry
American computer businesspeople
American esports players
American mass media company founders
American people of Chinese descent
American people of Hong Kong descent
Hong Kong people
American technology chief executives
American technology company founders
Businesspeople from Berkeley, California
Quake (series) players
People from Los Altos, California
Video game businesspeople
1977 births